CFOR can mean:

 CFOR-FM, a Canadian radio station
 CICX-FM, a Canadian radio station formerly known as CFOR
 Conservative Friends of Russia, a UK political interest group